Cuz We Can is the third studio album by Rehab. Originally available online in 2002, a pressed copy was released March 13, 2007. It is the last album to feature rapper Brooks Buford as he parted ways soon after this album was released online by him.

Background
Following the success of their official debut album Southern Discomfort, and coming off Warped Tour, the duo were ready to call it quits. On December 9, 2002, right before he was going to leave Rehab, Brooks Buford released a set of unreleased Rehab songs on his fan page/website that were recorded during and after the Southern Discomfort era that didn't make the album, These songs later became what we know of as Cuz We Can which was what Danny Boone named the album in 2007 when he scrapped some of the initial songs and decided to press it.

Track listing (2002 Internet release)
 "Intro (WFUK AM 420)" - 1:06
 "Here Come The Demons" - 2:54
 "Bonfire" - 3:59
 "Busted" - 4:00
 "Paranoid" - 3:55
 "We Ain't Come To Play" - 4:14
 "Run" - 3:50
 "E.M.S." - 0:42
 "I've Landed" - 4:16
 "No Time To Grieve" - 3:07
 "So Green" - 3:54
 "Defeated" - 5:01
 "Aim To Please (feat. Killer Mike)" - 4:46
 "Halftime" - 0:59
 "Sleeping Giant (feat. Killer Mike)" - 3:42
 "Rehab Function" - 3:15
 "Jesus Loves Me" - 4:04
 "Him And Her" - 3:27
 "Huh What" - 4:24
 "Shit On Me" - 3:21
 "Jaime" - 3:43
 "Amends" - 4:28
 "Ballad Of Dusty" - 3:27
 "Lawn Chair High (feat. Steaknife)" - 5:07
 "That Bad" - 3:08
 "Post-Game Show" - 0:32

Track listing (2007 pressed copy)
 "Intro (WFUK AM 420)" – 1:06
 "Here Come The Demons" – 2:54
 "Bonfire" – 3:59
 "We Ain't Come To Play" – 4:14
 "Jaime" – 3:43
 "Lawn Chair High (feat. Steaknife)" – 5:07
 "Interlude" – 0:41
 "Paranoid" – 3:55
 "Rehab Function" – 3:15
 "Run" – 3:50
 "Interlude" – 0:58
 "Sleeping Giant (feat. Killer Mike)" – 3:42
 "Deal With Me" – 3:27
 "The Ballad Of Dusty Spires" – 3:27
 "Do You" – 4:24
 "Then Again" – 3:21
 "Amends" – 4:28
 "Running For An Earhole" – 4:12
 "Sixteen Tons (feat. Steaknife)" – 4:13
 "Come On Children" - 3:30
 "Love Me Tomorrow" - 3:44
 "Just Let Go" - 3:58

Personnel
Danny "Boone" Alexander - Vocals
Jason "Brooks" Buford - Vocals 
Denny "Steaknife" Campbell - Producer, vocals

References

Rehab (band) albums
2002 albums